Prasophyllum crebriflorum, commonly known as the crowded leek orchid, is a species of orchid endemic to Tasmania. It has a single tubular, dark green leaf with a purplish base and up to twenty five reddish-brown flowers. It is only known from four relatively small populations growing at high altitudes.

Description
As with others in the genus, the flowers are inverted so that the labellum is above the column rather than below it. The lateral sepals are more or less erect and parallel to each other. There is a greenish, channelled, fleshy callus in the centre of the labellum. Flowering occurs from early December to January.

Taxonomy and naming
Prasophyllum crebriflorum was first formally described in 2003 by David Jones from a specimen collected near Guildford and the description was published in Muelleria. The specific epithet (crebriflorum) is derived from the Latin words creber meaning "close", "crowded" and flos meaning "flower".

Distribution and habitat
The crowded leek orchid is only known from four populations growing in grassland, two on the Central Plateau and two in the north-west of the state, all on private property at high elevations.

Conservation
Prasophyllum crebriflorum is classified as Endangered under the Tasmanian Threatened Species Protection Act 1995 and under the Commonwealth Government Environment Protection and Biodiversity Conservation Act 1999 (EPBC) Act. The main threats to the species are land clearing, grazing by livestock and inappropriate fire regimes.

References

External links 
 

crebriflorum
Endemic flora of Tasmania
Endemic orchids of Australia
Plants described in 2003